The Crusader Union of Australia (Crusaders or CRU), is a Bible-based, interdenominational, non-profit Christian youth organisation.

CRU is an organisation with three key ministry areas: 
 CRU Camps, which includes: CRU Holiday Camps, CRU Study Camps and CRU Day Camps
 Summit Educational Camps and 
 Schools Ministry (made up of CRU School Groups and CRU Resources)
CRU's frontline ministries are supported by two campsites (CRU Galston Gorge Camp & Conference Centre and CRU Lake Mac Camp & Conference Centre), and a Training Division.

History
Crusaders was founded in 1930 in New South Wales, Victoria, Queensland and South Australia by the Rev. Dr Howard Guinness, a visionary man keen to strengthen Christian work among school students in independent schools. He saw voluntary groups as a key to achieving this. 
The first Crusader Camp was held in 1930. In 1934 CRU was founded in Western Australia. From small beginnings in just four schools, CRU has expanded to serve 185 Independent schools in New South Wales and the ACT.  
The Crusader Women's Fellowship, began at Roseville Park in 1939 and has maintained an unbroken record of fellowship, prayer and support for the ministry. The group continues to meet to this day. 
The land for the Crusader site at Lake Macquarie NSW was donated by Dr Leslie Parr in the 1940s and in the 1950s Dr Paul White mortgaged his home to buy land at Galston Gorge site for £600. These sites are where the majority of CRU Camps take place.
In 1955 CRU merged with Scripture Union in all states except NSW. During the 1960s CRU became a Registered Company Limited by Guarantee to meet legal requirements. Initially established in Sydney's CBD, the office relocated to Strathfield in 1988, then Eastwood in 1993. The Crusader Union of NSW became the Crusader Union of Australia on 23 May 1990 and the Crusader ‘eagle’ logo was introduced in 1997. The CRU Camp brand was trademarked in 2002 and CRU celebrated its 80th anniversary in September 2010. In 2020 the 'eagle' logo was phased out and replace with the current stylised letters. CRU continues to grow and currently over 2,500 students are reached each week with the Gospel of Jesus Christ.

CRU Camps
CRU run many different types of camps, the main ones being:

CRU Holiday Camps
80+ camps are run during the school holidays each year for children in Years 3-12. They are mostly run by volunteer leadership teams, made up predominantly of university students, offering activities including sailing, horse riding, dirt-bike riding, wakeboarding, rock climbing, abseiling, skiing and much more.

CRU Study Camps
18+ Higher School Certificate & IB study camps are run each year for Year 12 students.

CRU Day Camps
Monday to Friday, daytime camps (typically 8am – 6pm) are run during the school holidays for children in Years K-12.

CRU Educational Camps 
Formerly known as Summit Educational Camps. Over 100 school camps are run each year, providing outdoor education to over 7,100 campers and training about 20 ministry trainees, called ‘Summit trainees’.

Schools ministry
Six full-time staff and four ministry associates address over 100,000 students each year in 185 independent schools across NSW and the ACT. There are also Christian groups across Australia using CRU Resources in their various ministries. The following schools have internal CRU Groups or Christian groups supported by CRU operating in them:

Sydney City

 SCEGGS Darlinghurst
 St Andrew's Cathedral School
 Sydney Grammar School

Northern Suburbs

 AbbotsleighInfants, Junior and Senior
 Barker College
 Berowra Christian Community School
 Covenant Christian School
 Knox Grammar School
 Loquat Valley Anglican Preparatory School
 Mosman Preparatory School
 Newington College, Lindfield Preparatory
 Northern Beaches Christian School
 Oxford Falls Grammar School
 Pymble Ladies College
 Queenwood School for Girls
 Ravenswood
 Redlands
 Roseville College
 Sydney Church of England Grammar School
 St Luke's Grammar School
 Sydney Grammar School, St Ives Preparatory
 Wenona

Inner West

 Meriden School
 MLC School
 Newington College
 Wyvern House
 Northcross Christian School
 Presbyterian Ladies' College, Sydney
 Regent's Park Christian School
 Trinity Grammar School
 Trinity Grammar School Preparatory School

Western Suburbs

 Penrith Anglican College
 Penrith Christian School
 Richard Johnson Anglican School
 St Paul's Grammar School
 Toongabbie Christian School
 Tyndale Christian School
 William Carey Christian School

Eastern Suburbs

 Claremont College
 Cranbrook School
 Kambala
 St Catherine's School, Waverley
 Sydney Grammar School, Edgecliff Preparatory

Southern Suburbs

 Danebank
 Georges River Grammar School
 Inaburra School
 St George Christian School
 Sutherland Shire Christian School

South Western Suburbs

 Broughton Anglican College
 Macarthur Anglican School
 Thomas Hassall Anglican College
 St Peter's Anglican Primary School

Parramatta and the Hills District

 Arden Anglican School
 Arndell Anglican College
 Northholm Grammar School
 Norwest Christian College
 Pacific Hills Christian School
 Rouse Hill Anglican College
 Tara Anglican School for Girls
 The Hills Grammar School
 The King's School, Parramatta
 William Clarke College

Central West

 All Saints College, Batthurst
 Blue Mountains Grammar School
 Kinross Wolaroi School
 The Scots School, Bathurst

Mid North Coast

 Belmont Christian School
 Central Coast Grammar School
 Green Point Christian College
 Lakes Grammar School
 Scone Grammar
 St. Philip's Christian College

Southern Highlands

 Tudor House School
 Wollondilly Anglican College

South Coast

 Illawarra Christian School
 Nowra Anglican College
 Shellharbour Anglican College
 Shoalhaven Anglican School
 The Illawarra Grammar School

Australian Capital Territory

 Brindabella Christian College
 Burgmann Anglican School
 Canberra Girls' Grammar School
 Canberra Grammar School
 Radford College
 Trinity Christian School

Campsites
CRU's ministries are supported by two residential campsites: CRU Galston Gorge Camp & Conference Centre, located in Galston Gorge and CRU Lake Mac Camp & Conference Centre, located in Lake Macquarie with water-based activities and its own sailing fleet.

CRU Galston Gorge Camp & Conference Centre (Galston Gorge Centre, NSW)
CRU Galston Gorge is located 45 minutes from Sydney's CBD in a bushland location. The majority of the CRU Study Camps are run at this location.

CRU Lake Mac Camp & Conference Centre (Lake Mac, NSW)
CRU Lake Mac is suitable for Christian youth camps, church camps or school groups. Located in Lake Macquarie, 60 minutes from Hornsby or Gosford, the newly-renovated campsite can sleep 260 guests in its brand-new ensuite accommodation, and an additional 120 guests in its classic A-frame cabins.

Training 
CRU is a Registered Training Organisation (NTIS No. 90717) offering training in ‘Apply First Aid’ (formerly Senior First Aid).

Crusader Council
The Crusader Union of Australia (CRU) is governed by a board of 13 members, each bringing a wealth of experience, insight and wisdom to the organisation.

Chairman
Philip Bell, OAM

Deputy chairman
Jennie Ford, BEd. TCert.

Hon. Treasurer
Santino Dimarco, BEc. CA.

Council Members 
Alan Barnwell, B.Build (Hons)
Patrick Benn, BSc (Hons), BTh.
Helen Burgess, BA, LLB (Hons), FCIS, FAICD
Victoria Hayman, BID, MA CommManagement
Clare Pendlebury, BComm. CA
Mark Rundle, BA DipEd. BD (Hons). DipMin.
James Ward, MA Business, BA Design
Annette Ware, B Ed, Dip Theology
Tim Wright, PhD, DipEd, BSc(Hons), FACE, MRACI, CChem.

Hon. Solicitor
Mr D.C. Ford, BA. LLM (Hons)

Secretary
Elizabeth White, DipBusAdmin, Cert IV CMin

References

Wambuah# kelvin. (2020),the crusader union of Australia, Longhorn publishers

Additional sources
 The Sydney Morning Herald – Google News Archive Search
 The Age – Google News Archive Search
 The Age – Google News Archive Search
 Schools Provide Great Opportunities For Evangelism

External links
 Official website

Christian organizations established in 1930
Youth organizations established in 1930
Christian organisations based in Australia
Christian youth organizations
1930 establishments in Australia
Youth organisations based in Australia